Riofrío is a town and  municipality located in the Department of Valle del Cauca, Colombia.

References

Municipalities of Valle del Cauca Department